Heart Full of Wine is the second EP by Australian singer-songwriter duo Angus and Julia Stone.

A video clip was produced for the title track.

Track listing

References

2007 EPs
Angus & Julia Stone albums
Independiente Records albums